

See also

Chris Biscoe

Albums
 "Chris Biscoe Sextet" (Walking Wig)
 "Modern Alarms" (Walking Wig)
 "Profiles of Mingus" (Trio Records)
 "Music Is - Chris Biscoe Plays Mike Westbrook" (Trio Records)

Other endeavors

as Full Monte:
 "The Saxophone Phenomenon" (Slam)
 Spark in the Dark (Slam)

with the NYJO:
 "NYJO" (1971; Philips)
 "NYJO" (1973; Charisma)

with Mike Westbrook:
 "The Paris Album" (Polydor)
 "Bright as Fire" (Impetus)
The Cortège (Original Records, 1982)
 On Duke's Birthday (hat ART, 1985)
 "London Bridge is Broken Down" (Virgin/Venture)
 "The Orchestra of Smith's Academy" (Enja)
 "Bar Utopia" (ASC)
 "Glad Day" (Enja)
 "Chanson Irresponsable" (Enja)
 "Art Wolf" (Altrisuoni) (a quartet with Pete Whyman, Chris Biscoe & Kate & Mike Westbrook)

with The Westbrook Trio: (also known as "A Little Westbrook Music" with Kate Westbrook, Mike Westbrook, Chris Biscoe
 "A Little Westbrook Music" (Westbrook Records)
 "Love for Sale" (hat ART)
 "The Lift" (Voiceprint)
with Grand Union Orchestra:

 "The Song of Many Tongues" (RedGold Records, 1986)
 "Freedom Calls" (RedGold Records, 1989)
 "The Rhythm of Tides" (RedGold Records, 1997)
 "Now Comes The Dragon's Hour" (RedGold Records, 2002)
 "12 For 12" (RedGold Records, 2011)

with The Dedication Orchestra:
 "Spirits Rejoice" (Ogun)
 "Ixesha" (Ogun)

with Ken Hyder:
 "Under the Influence" (Konnex)

with the Pete Hurt Orchestra:
 "Lost For Words" (Spotlight)

with John Williams:
 "Baritone Band" (Spotlight)

with the Didier Levallet Quintet:
 "Quiet Days" (Evidence)
 "Generations" (Evidence)

with Chris McGregor's Brotherhood of Breath:
 "Country Cooking" (Virgin/Venture)

with the Grand Union Orchestra:
 "Freedom Calls" (Redgold)
 "Rhythm of Tides" (Redgold)

with Ben Davis:
 "Double Dares are Sometimes Different" (FMR)

with Kate Westbrook & The Skirmishers:
 "Cuff Clout" (Voiceprint)

with Andy Sheppard:
 "Soft on the Inside" (Antilles)

with the George Russell Living Time Orchestra:
 The London Concert (Label Bleu)
 It's About Time (Label Bleu)

with Graham Collier:
 "Charles River Fragments" (Boathouse)

with Josefina Cupido:
 "One Woman, One Drum" (Sound & Language)

with the Orchestre National de Jazz:
 "ONJ Express" (Evidence)
 "Passages" (Evidence)
 "Deep Feelings" (Evidence)

with Harry Beckett:
 "A Tribute to Charles Mingus" (West Wind)
 "Before and After" (Jazzprint)

with the Liam Noble Group:
 "In The Meantime " (Basho)
with RedBrass:

 "Silence Is Consent" (Riverside Recordings, 1976)

Jazz discographies

Discographies of British artists